Steve Bingham (born 4 April 1949, Solihull, Warwickshire, England) is an English bass guitarist who joined the worldwide chart topping UK band The Foundations in 1969 - replacing their former bass player - and stayed with them until their break-up in 1970.

He played on the 1972 Ennismore album by Colin Blunstone, on the 1974 Anymore for Anymore album by Ronnie Lane, and the 1976 album Stars Fade (In Hotel Rooms) by Kevin Westlake. Steve also toured with Ronnie Lane and Slim Chance in "The Passing Show", which took a huge circus tent on the road with dancing girls, fire eaters, clowns and a general assortment of circus people.

In 1999, because of the popularity of the film There's Something About Mary, the renewed interest in '"Build Me Up Buttercup" and The Foundations, a version of the band reformed with Colin Young on vocals, Alan Warner on guitar, Bingham on bass, and Gary Moberley on keyboards, etc. The group stayed together for a period of time seeing a change of the lead singer with Hue Montgomery replacing Colin Young.

In recent years Bingham has been a member of Geno Washington and The Ram Jam Band as well as the "Reformed but Unrepentant" reunion edition of Slim Chance with original Slim Chance members Charlie Hart and Steve Simpson.

References

1949 births
Living people
English rock bass guitarists
Male bass guitarists
English rhythm and blues musicians
English rock musicians
English soul musicians
The Foundations members